Stellate cells are neurons in the central nervous system, named for their star-like shape formed by dendritic processes radiating from the cell body. Many stellate cells are GABAergic and are located in the molecular layer of the cerebellum.  Stellate cells are derived from dividing progenitor cells in the white matter of postnatal cerebellum. Dendritic trees can vary between neurons. There are two types of dendritic trees in the cerebral cortex, which include pyramidal cells, which are pyramid shaped and stellate cells which are star shaped. Dendrites can also aid neuron classification. Dendrites with spines are classified as spiny, those without spines are classified as aspinous. Stellate cells can be spiny or aspinous, while pyramidal cells are always spiny. Most common stellate cells are the inhibitory interneurons found within the upper half of the molecular layer in the cerebellum. Cerebellar stellate cells synapse onto the dendritic trees of Purkinje cells and send inhibitory signals. Stellate neurons are sometimes found in other locations in the central nervous system; cortical spiny stellate cells are found in layer IVC of the primary visual cortex. In the somatosensory barrel cortex of mice and rats, glutamatergic (excitatory) spiny stellate cells are organized in the barrels of layer 4. They receive excitatory synaptic fibres from the thalamus and process feed forward excitation to 2/3 layer of the primary visual cortex to pyramidal cells. Cortical spiny stellate cells have a 'regular' firing pattern. Stellate cells are chromophobes, that is cells that does not stain readily, and thus appears relatively pale under the microscope.

Cerebellar stellate cells are inhibitory and GABAergic.  Stellate and basket cells originate from the cerebellar ventricular zone (CVZ) along with Purkinje cells and Bergmann glia Due to their similarity, basket and stellate cells are grouped together when examined during migration, especially given they follow the same pathway. After mitosis, these cells start in the deep layer of the white matter and migrate up through the internal granular layer (IGL) and purkinje cell layer (PCL) until they reach the molecular layer. During their time in the molecular layer, they change orientation and positioning until they eventually end up in the middle portion of this layer, facing the rostrocaudal direction. Once in this layer, the stellate cells are guided to their correct placement by Bergman glial cells.

GABAergic aspinous stellate cells are found in the somatosensory cortex. Apart from visual classification of the aspinous dendrites, they can be immunohistochemically labelled with glutamic acid decarboxylase(GAD) because of their GABAergic activity, and occasionally colocalize with neuropeptides.

See also
 Stellate ganglion

References

External links
 NIF Search - Stellate Cell via the Neuroscience Information Framework

Cerebellum
Human cells
Central nervous system neurons